Nahla Élodie Nakkach (born 20 January 1995), known as Élodie Nakkach, is a footballer who plays as a midfielder for Swiss Women's Super League club Servette. Born in France, she represents Morocco at international level.

International career
Nakkach was capped for Morocco at senior level during the 2018 Africa Women Cup of Nations qualification (first round).

See also
List of Morocco women's international footballers

References

1995 births
Living people
Citizens of Morocco through descent
Moroccan women's footballers
Women's association football midfielders
Morocco women's international footballers
Sportspeople from Limoges
French women's footballers
French sportspeople of Moroccan descent
Division 1 Féminine players
ASJ Soyaux-Charente players
Dijon FCO (women) players
Footballers from Nouvelle-Aquitaine
French expatriate women's footballers
Moroccan expatriate footballers
Expatriate women's footballers in Switzerland
Moroccan expatriate sportspeople in Switzerland
French expatriate sportspeople in Switzerland